What About Bob? is a 1991 American black comedy film directed by Frank Oz and starring Bill Murray and Richard Dreyfuss. Murray plays Bob Wiley, a mentally unstable patient who follows his egotistical psychotherapist Dr. Leo Marvin (Dreyfuss) on vacation. When Bob befriends the other members of Leo's family, the patient's problems push the doctor over the edge.

The film received positive reviews and was a box office success. This film is number 43 on Bravo's "100 Funniest Movies".

Plot
Bob Wiley suffers from multiple phobias which makes it difficult for him to leave his New York City apartment. Despite regular therapy, he makes little progress and his anxiety compels him to seek constant reassurance from his therapists.

Exhausted by Bob's high-maintenance care needs and invasions of personal boundaries, his current therapist refers him to the egotistical Dr. Leo Marvin, who believes his recently published book Baby Steps will make him a household name. Bob feels good about their initial session, but Dr. Marvin dismisses Bob in a rush, as he is due for a month-long family vacation. Unable to cope, Bob contacts Leo via his telephone exchange and tries to find out where he is, but Leo dismisses him. Then Bob pays a prostitute to impersonate Leo's sister Lily so Bob can get by the switchboard operator and call him, but Leo tells Bob he cannot trust him if he pulls any more stunts like that. He then disguises himself as a homicide detective telling the switchboard operator that Bob committed suicide and tracks Leo to Lake Winnipesaukee, New Hampshire. Leo is annoyed, but sees Bob's desperation and tells him to "take a vacation" from his problems. Bob seems to have made a breakthrough, but the next morning, he tells Leo that he will also be vacationing at Lake Winnipesaukee as a guest of the Guttmans, who hold a grudge against Leo for purchasing the lakeside home they had been saving for years to buy.

Leo rejects Bob's attempts at friendship as he believes patients are beneath him, but Bob bonds with Leo's family and relates to the problems of Leo's kids, Anna and Sigmund "Siggy", in contrast with their father's clinical approach. Bob begins to enjoy life, going sailing with Anna and helping Sigmund dive, which Leo had been unsuccessfully trying for years. After Leo aggressively pushes Bob into the lake, Leo's wife Fay forces him to apologize, which he begrudgingly does. She then invites Bob to dinner and he accepts, believing Leo's hostility against him are either accidental or part of his therapy. After dinner, a thunderstorm forces Bob to spend the night.  Bob stops touching everything with tissues, showing some progress in overcoming his germaphobia. Leo wants Bob out of the house early the next morning before Good Morning America arrives to interview him about Baby Steps. The TV crew, oblivious to Leo's reluctance, suggest having Bob on the show as well. Leo humiliates himself during the interview, while Bob is relaxed and speaks highly of Leo and the book, inadvertently stealing the spotlight.

Leo attempts to have Bob institutionalized, but Bob is soon released after befriending the hospital staff and telling them therapy jokes, demonstrating his sanity and showing that he has made real therapeutic progress due to his time with Dr. Marvin's family. Forced to retrieve Bob, Leo abandons him in the middle of nowhere, but Bob quickly gets a ride back to Leo's house while various mishaps delay Leo. Returning after nightfall, Leo is surprised by the birthday party Fay has secretly planned for him and is delighted to see his beloved sister Lily. When Bob appears and puts his arm around Lily, Leo becomes enraged and attacks him. Bob still remains oblivious to Leo's behavior until Fay explains Leo's hatred for Bob, to which Bob finally understands and agrees to leave.

Leo breaks into a general store, stealing a shotgun and 20 pounds of explosives and kidnaps Bob at gunpoint. Leo leads him deep into the woods and ties him up with the explosives, calling it "death therapy", and returns to the house, gleefully preparing his cover story. Believing the explosives are props as a metaphor for his problems, Bob applies Leo's "Baby Steps" approach and manages to free himself of his restraints and remaining fears; he reunites with the Marvins and praises Leo for curing him. Leo asks Bob where the explosives are and Bob says they are in the family's vacation house, which promptly explodes into flames, much to the Guttmans' delight. Petrified, Leo is rendered catatonic and institutionalized while having his medical license revoked for attempted murder.

Some time later, Bob marries Leo's sister, and upon their pronouncement as husband and wife, the still-catatonic Leo finally regains his senses and screams, "No!", but the sentiment is lost in the family's excitement at his recovery, and Leo is forced to accept Bob as his new brother-in-law. Text at the end reveals that Bob went back to school and became a psychologist, then wrote a best-selling book titled Death Therapy, for which Leo is suing him for the rights.

Cast

Production
Before Frank Oz was hired to direct, Garry Marshall was considered, and Woody Allen was approached to play Dr. Marvin. Allen was also considered to direct and possibly co-write the script with Tom Schulman. However, because Allen had always generated his own projects rather than getting handed an existing property to make his own, Oz was hired to direct. Allen also declined the role of Dr. Marvin, thus Richard Dreyfuss was ultimately cast. Patrick Stewart was also considered for the role. Early in development, Robin Williams was attached to the project.

Filming
What About Bob? was filmed in and around the town of Moneta, Virginia, located on Smith Mountain Lake.

For the scene in which Bob accidentally blows the house up, producers used a -sized model replica of the actual house that they detonated on a nearby lot.

The scenes of Bob arriving in town on the bus with his goldfish were filmed in downtown Moneta, which was repainted for the movie. The local institute where Leo tries to commit Bob is actually the local Elks National Home for retirees in the nearby town of Bedford, Virginia.

Scenes were also shot in New York City. According to Oz, Murray was "really frightened" about filming in the city.

Murray confirmed that he improvised a lot in the film.

Production difficulties
Oz has confirmed in interviews that there was conflict on the set during the making of the film. In addition, both Murray and Dreyfuss have stated in separate interviews that they did not get along with each other during filming:

Oz himself also verified that there was a feud between Murray and Dreyfuss:

In subsequent interviews, Dreyfuss reiterated what he said of his experience working with Murray, notably when he appeared at Fan Expo Canada in 2017. Dreyfuss further alleged in 2019 that at one point during the production, Murray screamed at him while intoxicated, telling him "Everyone hates you! You are tolerated!" and then threw an ashtray at him. When Murray appeared on The Howard Stern Show in 2014, Howard Stern asked him if he intended to irritate Dreyfuss.  Murray responded: "I really try to make the other actor look good whenever I can (...) In this particular film, annoying Dreyfuss, which I kind of got to enjoy I gotta confess—but I didn't try to annoy him off the screen." Although neither of them have crossed paths since the release of the film, Dreyfuss confirmed in a 2020 interview that he has forgiven Murray.

Producer Laura Ziskin recalled having a disagreement with Murray that resulted in his tossing her into a lake. Ziskin confirmed in 2003: "Bill also threatened to throw me across the parking lot and then broke my sunglasses and threw them across the parking lot. I was furious and outraged at the time, but having produced a dozen movies, I can safely say it is not common behavior".

In April 2022, following the suspension of the Being Mortal production, Dreyfuss's son Ben tweeted a recollection about Murray's on-set behavior towards his father and Ziskin: "Bill Murray had a meltdown during [What About Bob?] because he wanted an extra day off and Laura said no and he ripped her glasses off her face and my dad complained about his behavior and Bill Murray threw an ashtray at him." Ben also added, "Everyone walked off the production and flew back to L.A. and it only resumed after Disney hired some bodyguards to physically separate my dad and Bill Murray in between takes."

Profits lawsuit
In April 2015, Richard Dreyfuss sued The Walt Disney Company over the film's profits. Dreyfuss has claimed that Disney refused to hire his chosen auditor, Robinson and Co. Christine Turner Wagner, widow of Turner & Hooch (1989) producer Raymond Wagner, was also involved with the lawsuit.

Reception

What About Bob? was a financial success. Made on a $39 million budget, it grossed $64 million domestically during its original theatrical run, Buena Vista's highest-grossing live action film of the year.

Critical response

Critical reaction was also favorable. Review aggregation website Rotten Tomatoes gives the film a "Certified Fresh" 82% rating based on reviews from 44 critics with an average rating of 6.50/10. The site's consensus reads: "Bill Murray and Richard Dreyfuss' chemistry helps make the most of a familiar yet durable premise, elevating What About Bob? into the upper ranks of '90s comedies".

When the television program Siskel and Ebert reviewed the film, Roger Ebert gave the film a "thumbs up" rating praising the different performances of Bill Murray and Richard Dreyfuss onscreen together as well as most of the film's humor. He said it was Bill Murray's best movie since Ghostbusters in 1984. Gene Siskel gave it a "thumbs down" rating and felt Murray gave a very funny and enjoyable performance in the film, but was rather upset by the Dreyfuss character and his angry and arrogant behaviors. He felt it would have been funnier if Dreyfuss had not given such an angry performance in the film and said that Dreyfuss ultimately ruined the film for him.

Leonard Maltin also gave the film a favorable review: in Leonard Maltin's Movie and Video Guide he gives the film three stars out of a possible four, saying it's "a very funny outing with Murray and Dreyfuss approaching the relationship of the road runner and the coyote". Maltin faulted the film only for its ending, which he found very abrupt and silly.

Lou Cedrone from The Baltimore Sun criticized the film: "It is too predictable and deals with a situation that is more irritating than amusing".

See also 

 Anger Management — 2003 buddy comedy film about a businessman and his therapist

References

External links

 
 
 
 

1990s black comedy films
1991 comedy films
1991 films
American black comedy films
1990s English-language films
Agoraphobia in fiction
Films about codependency
Films about dysfunctional families
Films about obsessive–compulsive disorder
Films about psychiatry
Films about narcissism
Films about vacationing
Films directed by Frank Oz
Films scored by Miles Goodman
Films set in New Hampshire
Films set in New York City
Films shot in Virginia
Films with screenplays by Alvin Sargent
Touchstone Pictures films
1990s American films